Adan Juárez Serrano (born 18 December 1969) is a Mexican cyclist. He competed in the men's individual road race at the 1996 Summer Olympics.

Notes

References

External links
 

1969 births
Living people
Mexican male cyclists
Olympic cyclists of Mexico
Cyclists at the 1996 Summer Olympics
Place of birth missing (living people)
20th-century Mexican people
21st-century Mexican people